Madalag, officially the Municipality of Madalag (Aklanon: Banwa it Madalag; Hiligaynon: Banwa sang Madalag), is a 4th class municipality in the province of Aklan, Philippines. It is Aklan's largest municipality by land area and also the most sparsely populated. According to the 2020 census, it has a population of 18,890 people.

Madalag was formerly an arrabal and part of Libacao. In 1948, it was separated and constituted as a separate town, with the following barrios: Logohon, Singay, Balactasan, Cabangahan, Cabilawan, Pangitan, San Jose, Talimagao, Talangban, Alaminos, Catabana, Bakyang, Calicia, Mercedes, Maria Cristina, Dit-ana, Guinato-an, Tigbauan, Alas-as, Mamba, Medina, Panikyason, and Paningayan.

Geography

According to the Philippine Statistics Authority, the municipality has a land area of  constituting  of the  total area of Aklan.

Madalag is situated in the south-central section of the province, bounded on the east by Balete, west by the Province of Antique, north by Malinao and Banga, and south by Libacao.

Soil
There are four varied soil types found in the municipality. They are the San Miguel Clay Loam, Alimodian clay loam, Sapcan clay and Sigcay clay. San Miguel clay is found in barangay Panipiason and Medina. Alimodian clay is found in barangay San Jose, Ma. Cristina and Galicia. Sapian clay is found in the barangay of Mercedes, Bacyang and Alaminos. Sigcay clay is found in the Poblacion, Logohon and Cabilawan.

Land Use

Climate

Madalag has a Type III climate which is relatively dry from March to May and wet for the rest of the year.

Barangays
Madalag is politically subdivided into 25 barangays.

Demographics

In the 2020 census, Madalag had a population of 18,890.

Madalag being predominantly a rural community has a slow growing population. It had a total population of 17,889 persons in 2007, a reduction of .05 percent or 897 persons from the 1995 population, basically due to migration towards industrial and trade centers of the country such as Manila, Cebu, Iloilo and other highly urbanized provinces and municipalities.

The municipality has twenty-five component barangays with two barangays, Poblacion and Alaminos as urban area and the twenty-three remaining barangays as rural areas. Barangay Poblacion is the most populous with 1,775 residents, followed by Panipiason (1,484 residents) and Alaminos (1,257).

Economy

Agriculture
Madalag basically has an agricultural economy. Some  of the municipality land is devoted to agriculture. Farming and home industries are the main source of livelihood among the people. Rice is grown in almost all the twenty five (25) barangays. Corn is also planted in some upland areas. Other crops are in pineapple, camote and ube. The municipality also produces fruit trees, like lanzones, rambutan, marang and commercial crops such as coconut and abaca.

The hilly and mountainous areas produce high valued forest products such as narra, acacia, and mahogany and minor product like buri, rattan, bamboo, nipa sap and firewood.

Industry
The center of commercial activities in Madalag is situated along the  stretch of Navarette Street and at the Madalag Public Market located in the Poblacion.

The municipality has 93 commercials establishment dominated by the sari-sari stores (37 or 39%). The others establishment (26 or 28.60%) serve as outlet for bakery, carinderias and other recreational services.

Infrastructure

Communication
The communication system are operated by a wireless handset (cellPhone) distributed by SMART, GLOBE and SUN while the postal system is managed by the Philippines Postal Corporation. The post office is managed by a postal master, and a mail sorter/carrier. There are no mail distribution and collection centers in the barangays, hence the residents go to the Poblacion to post or get their mails.

Power and energy
There are 100 household in the barangay Poblacion of Madalag served by electricity with only 5 percent of households not served by power. The remaining twenty-four have electrical power.

Transportation
Of these lengths, ten percent are paved. A total of fifty percent of the road surface is earth fill while thirty percent is gravel surface. All barangays are accessible by roads except, Medina and Panipiason, that cannot be reach by four wheel vehicle. Generally, the barangays connected to the national road have better road condition compared to the interior barangays.

Water system
Water is supplied by the Poblacion Water District and Poblacion Spring Development. The other barangays are dependent from their Spring Development and artesian and shallow wells.

Healthcare
Madalag has one rural health unit (RHU) and one municipal hospital (Don Leovigildo N. Diapo Sr Memorial Hospital).

Education
Madalag has 21 primary and 8 elementary schools with a total enrollment of 2,927 pupils and 108 teachers. It has three secondary public schools with a total enrollment of 1,368 students and 43 teachers.

References

External links

 [ Philippine Standard Geographic Code]

Municipalities of Aklan